My Everything is the sixth studio album by American singer Anita Baker. It was released by Blue Note Records on September 7, 2004 in the United States. It was Baker's first album for the label and her first album of new material in ten years. For her comeback album, Baker wanted to be "in control" of everything, and once again teamed up with Barry J. Eastmond and George Duke. Kenneth "Babyface" Edmonds also contributed. Baker wrote or co-wrote eight of the album's ten tracks. The last track, "Men in My Life" was written for her then-husband and two sons.

The album debuted at number four on the US [[Billboard 200|Billboard 200]] and reached the top of the Top R&B/Hip-Hop Albums chart, selling 132,000 copies in its first week. By May 2005, the album had sold 568,000 copies in the US and been certified Gold by the Recording Industry Association of America (RIAA).

Critical reception

AllMusic editor Thom Jurek wrote that "some may be frustrated that, after such a long time, Baker doesn't push the envelope more stylistically. This may be true in terms of the material itself, but that's not necessarily a bad thing. Right down the line, Baker delivers on what she does best [...]. This is a worthy return, qualitatively standing head and shoulders above most everything else in its class." Beth Johnson, writing for Entertainment Weekly, remarked that "Baker picks up where she left off in '94. Granted, there isn't a monster hit on My Everything'' on par with her R&B; classics like "Sweet Love," but in these say-anything times it's next to revolutionary that she can whip her warm, luxurious voice into take-me-now passion while keeping it entirely."

Track listing

Personnel and credits 
Musicians

 Anita Baker – lead and backing vocals, arrangements (1-5, 7, 8, 10)
 Barry J. Eastmond – keyboards, percussion, backing vocals, arrangements (1-5, 7, 8, 10), horn arrangements (1, 9) 
 George Duke – additional synthesizer, percussion
 Leo Colon – additional synthesizer
 Eric Rehl – additional synthesizer
 Russell Ferrante – acoustic piano (9), arrangements (9)
 Phil Hamilton – guitar
 Paul Jackson Jr. – guitar
 Robert Randolph – guitar
 Babyface – guitar (6), arrangements (6), backing vocals
 Gerald Albright – bass
 Alex Al – bass
 Nathan East – bass
 Reggie Hamilton – bass
 Jimmy Haslip – bass
 Ron Jenkins – bass
 Al Turner – bass
 Bernard Davis – drums
 Steve Ferrone – drums
 William Kennedy – drums
 Ricky Lawson – drums
 Bashiri Johnson – percussion
 Rafael Padilla – percussion (6)
 Gary Bias – tenor saxophone (1, 9)
 Dan Higgins – baritone saxophone (1, 9), tenor saxophone (1, 9)
 Eric Marienthal – alto sax solo (9)
 Reggie Young – trombone (1, 9)
 Gary Grant – trumpet (1, 9)
 Jerry Hey – trumpet (1, 9), horn arrangements (1, 9) 
 The Ridgeway Sisters – backing vocals (1), BGV  arrangement (1)
 Gordon Chambers – backing vocals
 Perri – backing vocals
 Kenya Ivey – backing vocals (6)

Production

 Executive Producer – Anita Baker
 Producers – Barry J. Eastmond (Tracks 1-5, 7, 8 & 9); Babyface (Track 6); Anita Baker (Track 10). 
 Production Coordinator – Maria Eastmond
 Engineers – Anita Baker, Dylan Dresdow, George Duke, Barry J. Eastmond, Allen Sides, Kevin Syzmanski and Ghian Wright (Tracks 1-5 & 7-10); Paul Boutin (Track 6).
 Assistant Engineers (Tracks 1-5 & 7-10) – Greg Burns, Jared Nugent, Kevin Syzmanski and Tom Wilber.
 Mixing – George Duke and Erik Zobler (Tracks 1-5 & 7-10); Jon Gass (Track 6).
 Mix Assistants – Stefaniah McGowan (Tracks 1-5 & 7-10); Edward Quesada (Track 6).
 Art Direction – Gordon H. Gee
 Design – Greenberg Kingsley
 Photography – Andrew Eccles
 Hair – Q
 Make-up – Reggie Wells
 Wardrobe – Evan Ross and Anita Baker
 Project Management – Shaneika D. Brooks

Charts

Weekly charts

Year-end charts

Certifications

See also
List of number-one R&B albums of 2004 (U.S.)

References

2004 albums
Anita Baker albums
Blue Note Records albums